Gratton is a civil parish in the Derbyshire Dales district of central Derbyshire, half a mile west of the neighbouring village,  Elton.

See also
Listed buildings in Gratton, Derbyshire

Civil parishes in Derbyshire
Derbyshire Dales